= Lago Retico =

Lake in Ticino, Switzerland

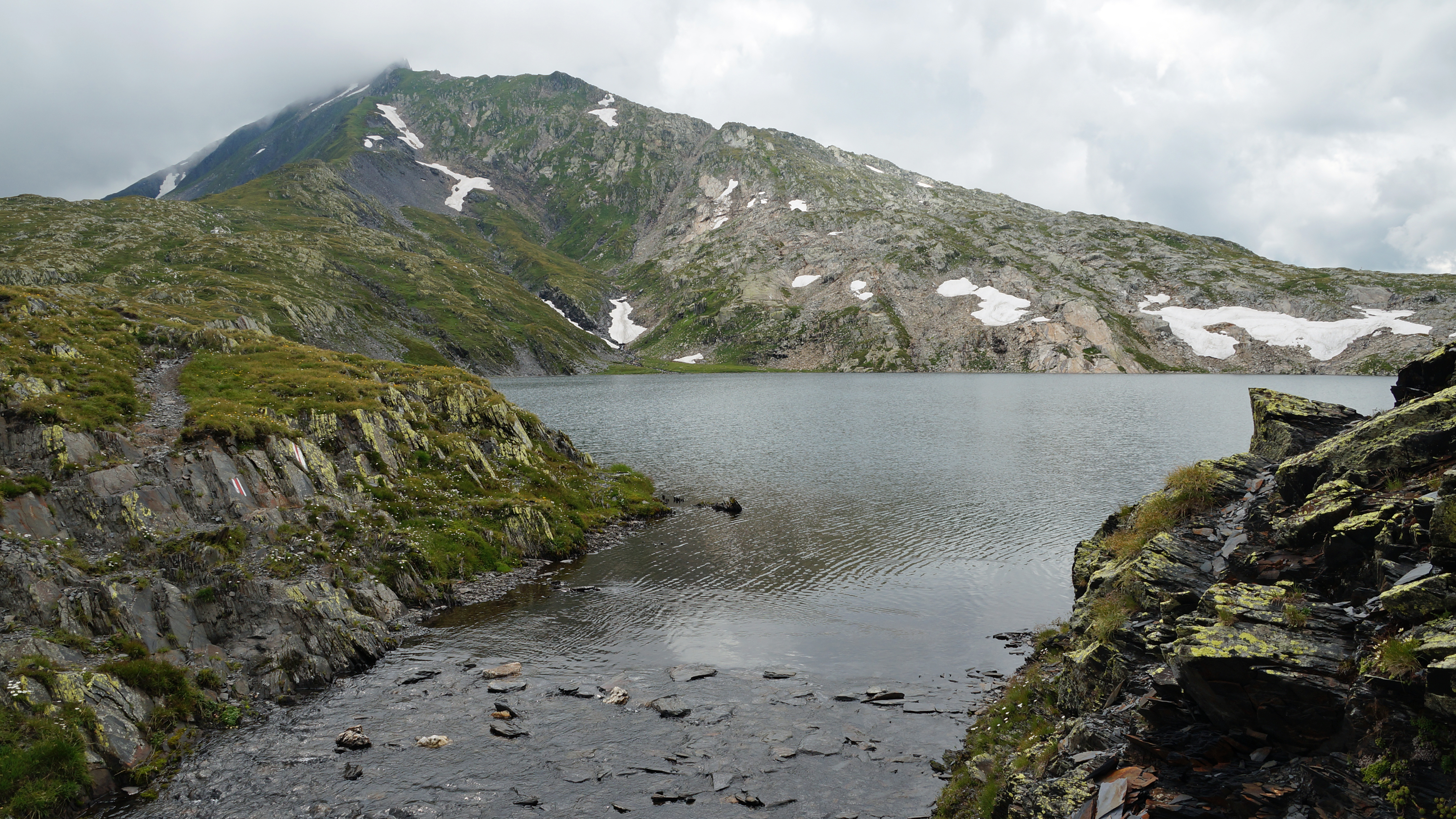
- Looking west from the outflow to the Cima della Bianca

- Location within Canton of Ticino Location within Canton of Graubünden Location within Switzerland Location within Alps
- Interactive map of Lago Retico
- Location: Ticino
- Coordinates: 46°34′38″N 8°53′28″E
- Basin countries: Switzerland
- Surface area: 8.5 ha (21 acres)
- Surface elevation: 2,372 m (7,782 ft)

Lago Retico is a lake in the canton Ticino, Switzerland. Its surface area is 8.5 ha (21 acres).
